The 2018 Iowa State Senate elections took place as part of the biennial 2018 United States elections. Iowa voters elected state senators in half of the state senate's districts—the 25 odd-numbered state senate districts. State senators serve four-year terms in the Iowa State Senate, with half of the seats up for election each cycle.

The primary election on June 5, 2018 determined which candidates appeared on the November 6, 2018 general election ballot. Primary election results can be obtained here.

Following the previous 2016 Iowa Senate election, Republicans flipped control of the Iowa state Senate, taking control away from the Democrats.

To reclaim control of the chamber from Republicans, the Democrats needed to net 6 Senate seats.

Republicans expanded their control of the Iowa State Senate following the 2018 general election, increasing their majority from 29 to 32 seats. Democrats saw their numbers dwindle from 20 to 18 seats. The lone Independent member of the IA state Senate was replaced by a Republican as well.

Summary of Results
NOTE: Only odd-numbered Iowa Senate seats were up for election in 2018, so even-numbered seats are not included here.

Source:

Closest races 
Seats where the margin of victory was under 10%:
 
  gain 
   
   
   
  gain
 
  gain

Detailed Results
Reminder: Only odd-numbered Iowa Senate seats were up for election in 2018, so even-numbered seats are not included here.

Note: If a district does not list a primary, then that district did not have a competitive primary (i.e., there may have only been one candidate file for that district).

District 1

District 3

District 5

District 7

District 9

District 11

District 13

District 15

District 17

District 19

District 21

District 23

District 25

District 27

District 29

District 31

District 33

District 35

District 37

District 39

District 41

District 43

District 45

District 47

District 49

Source:

See also
 United States elections, 2018
 United States House of Representatives elections in Iowa, 2018
 Elections in Iowa

References

Senate
Iowa Senate elections
Iowa State Senate